A referendum on electoral reform was held in Botswana on 4 October 1997. The referendum had three separate proposals, and came following promises made by President Quett Masire after violent protests in 1995. All three proposals were passed, although voter turnout was only around 17%.

Question I
The first question asked voters whether they approved of amending the constitution, and replace the post of Supervisor of Elections, introduced following the 1987 referendum, and replacing it with an independent electoral commission.

Question II
The second question asked voters whether they approved of amending the constitution to allow Botswanans living abroad to vote.

Question III
The third question asked voters whether they approved of amending the constitution to lower the voting age from 21 to 18.

References

Botswana
Electoral
Referendums in Botswana
Electoral reform in Botswana
Electoral reform referendums